78 Virginis is a variable star in the zodiac constellation of Virgo, located 175 light-years from the Sun. It has the variable star designation CW Virginis and the Bayer designation o Virginis; 78 Virginis is the Flamsteed designation. This object is visible to the naked eye as a faint, white-hued star with an apparent visual magnitude of 4.92. It is moving closer to the Earth with a heliocentric radial velocity of −10 km/s.

This is an Ap star with a stellar classification of ApEuCrSr, displaying strong lines of strontium, chromium, and other iron peak elements. It is a candidate rapidly oscillating Ap (roAp) star. This star is 435 million years old with 2.16 times the mass of the Sun and 2.11 times the Sun's radius. It is radiating 27 times the Sun's luminosity from its photosphere at an effective temperature of 9,100 K.

References 

A-type main-sequence stars
Ap stars
Alpha2 Canum Venaticorum variables
Rapidly oscillating Ap stars
Virgo (constellation)
Virginis, o
Durchmusterung objects
Virginis, 078
118022
066200
5105
Virginis, CW